The history of ambassadors of the United States to Ukraine began in 1992. Until 1991, the Ukrainian Soviet Socialist Republic had been a constituent SSR of the Soviet Union.

History
Upon the breakup of the USSR, the parliament of Ukraine declared the nation's independence on August 24, 1991. On December 1, 1991, the people of Ukraine voted to approve the declaration by a wide margin.

The United States recognized Ukraine on December 26, 1991, and the U.S. embassy in Kyiv was established on January 23, 1992, with Jon Gundersen as Chargé d'Affaires ad interim. The first ambassador was commissioned in May 1992.

The U.S. Embassy in Ukraine is located in Kyiv. In January 2022, the embassy requested the evacuation of non-essential personnel and their families as the 2021–2022 Russo-Ukrainian crisis escalated.

Chiefs of mission

See also

 Ukraine–United States relations
 Ambassadors of the United States
 Embassy of the United States, Kyiv
 Embassy of Ukraine, Washington, D.C.
 Ambassadors of Ukraine to the United States of America

Notes

References
United States Department of State: Background notes on Ukraine

External links
 United States Department of State: Chiefs of Mission for Ukraine
 United States Department of State: Ukraine
 United States Embassy in Ukraine

Ukraine
 
United States